San Marcos Unified School District (SMUSD) is a public school district based in San Marcos, California, and includes 19 schools with educational programs for kindergarten through adult education students. SMUSD serves San Marcos, as well as sections of Vista, Escondido, Carlsbad, and some unincorporated areas of the county. SMUSD is the 5th largest school district in San Diego County, serving over 19,000 students.

Governing Board 
The district is governed by a five-member governing board, also known as the school board.

The five current board members include Carlos Ulloa, Sarah Ahmad, Andrés Martín, Jaime Chamberlin, and Stacy Carlson.

Current board members

District office
Superintendent

The superintendent of the San Marcos Unified School District is Andy Johnsen, beginning in July 2021. He previously served as associate superintendent, and later superintendent of the Lakeside Union School District between 2015 and 2021.

Educational Services

Tiffany Campbell is deputy superintendent of schools. She previously served as assistant superintendent of educational services, director of secondary education, and principal of San Marcos High School.

Steve Baum, executive director of educational services, leads the department. He previously served as director of secondary education, and principal of Double Peak School, and Twin Oaks and Knob Hill Elementary Schools. Nicole DiRanna is director of curriculum and instruction.

Business Services

Erin Garcia serves as assistant superintendent of business services.

Human Resources

Gary DeBora is director of human resources and development.

Schools

High schools
Mission Hills High School
San Marcos High School
Foothills High School (alternative)
Twin Oaks High School (alternative)

Middle schools
San Elijo Middle School
San Marcos Middle School
Woodland Park Middle School

Elementary schools
Joli Ann Leichtag Elementary School
La Costa Meadows Elementary School
Carrillo Elementary School
Discovery Elementary School
Paloma Elementary School
Richland Elementary School
San Elijo Elementary School
San Marcos Elementary School
Twin Oaks Elementary School
Knob Hill Elementary School

K-8 schools
Double Peak School
La Mirada Academy

References

External links
 

School districts in San Diego County, California
Education in San Marcos, California
North County (San Diego County)
Carlsbad, California
Escondido, California
Vista, California